Raeanne Presley is an American politician of the Republican Party, having served four terms as Mayor of Branson, Missouri. Presley had previously served as an alderman in Branson, and had lost an election for mayor to Lou Schaeffer in the mid-1990s. She was defeated for re-election in 2015 by Karen Best.

Before serving as mayor Presley was the Chairman of the Missouri Tourism Commission and had served on several community boards including as Chairman of the Board of Directors of Skaggs Community Hospital, Board of Trustees of the Springfield-Branson National Airport, and the Branson Lakes Area Chamber of Commerce.

Raeanne Presley is co-owner of Branson Visitor TV and Presley's Country Jubilee Theater, billed as the first live performance theater on the Branson Strip, and has extensive ties to and experience in the travel industry spanning over forty years.  She is a Certified Tour Professional (NTA designation) and a Certified Travel Industry Specialist (ABA designation).

Presley has been a Branson resident since 1968, having graduated from Branson High School as High School Valedictorian in 1975.

Presley was first elected mayor of Branson in 2007, then re-elected in 2009, 2011, and 2013. She previously served as a Branson City Council Alderman for 10 years. She has also served in leadership positions with the Missouri Tourism Commission, Cox Health Center Branson, Springfield/Branson National Airport, Council of Churches of the Ozarks, Ozarks Technical Community College Foundation, and Community Partnership of the Ozarks.

Presley has been compared in the press with Sarah Palin due to her similar political start as a mayor.

Raeanne Presley is married to Steve Presley and has three children, all of which work in the Presley Music Theater as performers.

Raeanne also gave a cameo in the Virgin 2015 April Fools prank about Virgin US moving to Branson, Missouri.

References

Living people
People from Branson, Missouri
Missouri Republicans
Mayors of places in Missouri
Women mayors of places in Missouri
Year of birth missing (living people)
21st-century American women